McLean is a hamlet (and census-designated place) in Tompkins County, New York, United States. McLean has a post office with ZIP code 13102, which opened on June 30, 1826.

References

Hamlets in Tompkins County, New York
Hamlets in New York (state)